The AK-5 is a single-seat club class sailplane designed and built in Germany by members of Akaflieg Karlsruhe.

Design and development

The forward fuselage of the glider was taken from the Glasflügel 604 and the wings were built to the design of the Streifeneder-Hansen Falcon glider, an experimental prototype designed and built by Hansjörg Streifeneder. The cockpit interior was newly designed including a self-designed and built flight director / variometer system and parallelogram control input system similar to Glasflügel practice.

The experience gained while building the new winglets for the AK-8 glider will be used to improve the performance of the AK-5. It is planned to build extensions to the existing wings and to attach winglets.

Specifications

References

External links 

Akaflieg Karlsruhe 
Akaflieg Karlsruhe homepage

1990s German sailplanes
Akaflieg Karlsruhe aircraft
T-tail aircraft
Aircraft first flown in 1990